Élisabeth Tardy (born 2 November 1972) is a French cross-country skier. She competed in three events at the 1994 Winter Olympics.

Cross-country skiing results
All results are sourced from the International Ski Federation (FIS).

Olympic Games

World Cup

Season standings

References

External links
 

1972 births
Living people
French female cross-country skiers
Olympic cross-country skiers of France
Cross-country skiers at the 1994 Winter Olympics
Sportspeople from Saint-Étienne
20th-century French women